Ferdinand of Castile may refer to:

Fernando Ansúrez I (died 929), count
Fernán González of Castile (died 970), count
Ferdinand I of León and Castile (died 1056), king
Ferdinand of Castile (died 1211), infante
Ferdinand III of Castile (died 1252), king
Ferdinand of Castile (born 1238), infante
Ferdinand de la Cerda (died 1275), infante
Ferdinand IV of Castile (died 1312), king
Ferdinand II of Aragon and V of Castile (died 1516), king